Apaxtla is one of the 81 municipalities of Guerrero, in south-western Mexico. The municipal seat lies at Apaxtla de Castrejón. The municipality covers an area of 857.1 km².

In 2005, the municipality had a total population of 12,381.

References

Municipalities of Guerrero